Pablo Alborán is the debut album by Spanish singer-songwriter Pablo Alborán. Produced by Manuel Illán, many of the songs included in the album had already achieved YouTube attention before its release, as home videos featuring Alborán performing in front of a webcam, alone with his guitar. The album also includes duets with Carminho ("Perdóname"), Estrella Morente ("Desencuentro"), and Diana Navarro ("Solamente Tú"). The iTunes version adds the bonus track "Cuando te Alejas".

Pablo Alborán was released on February 1, 2011, and quickly became a huge success on the Spanish Albums Chart, where it debuted at number one, preventing Sergio Dalma's Via Dalma, the best-selling album of 2010 in Spain, from an 11th consecutive week topping the charts. Pablo Alborán went on to spend 15 weeks at the top of the charts, including a run of seven consecutive weeks taking place six months after the album's release date. It was certified six-time platinum by Productores de Música de España, becoming the top-selling album of 2011 in Spain, and was also nominated for a Latin Grammy Award for Best Pop Vocal Album, Male.

Singles
 "Solamente Tú" was released as the album's lead single on September 14, 2010. The song was a huge hit on the Spanish Singles Chart, becoming Alborán's first-ever number-one single on February 27, 2011. It stayed at number one for two consecutive weeks, and was certified platinum on May 8, 2011. It went on to stay on the Top 10 for 32 consecutive weeks, from February to September, including 20 weeks on the Top 5.
 "Miedo" was released as the album's second single on May 13, 2011. The song peaked at number 43 on the Spanish Singles Chart.

Track listing

Charts

Weekly charts

Year-end charts

Certifications

Release history

See also
List of number-one albums of 2011 (Spain)

References

2011 albums
Spanish-language albums
Pablo Alborán albums